Otto Bernhard Bengtsson (20 August 1921 – 4 June 1998) was a Swedish javelin thrower who won the national title in 1953. He competed at the 1952 Summer Olympics and 1954 European Athletics Championships and finished in 11th and 5th place, respectively.

References

External links
 

1921 births
1998 deaths
Swedish male javelin throwers
Olympic athletes of Sweden
Athletes (track and field) at the 1952 Summer Olympics
People from Kristianstad Municipality
Sportspeople from Skåne County